Ernest Albert Bailey (15 November 1881 – 16 August 1966) was an Australian cricketer. He played one first-class match for South Australia in 1906/07.

See also
 List of South Australian representative cricketers

References

External links
 

1881 births
1966 deaths
Australian cricketers
South Australia cricketers
Cricketers from Adelaide